La Côte-de-Gaspé is a regional county municipality on the Gaspé peninsula in eastern Quebec, Canada, part of the Gaspésie–Îles-de-la-Madeleine region. The seat is Gaspé.

Its largest community is the city of Gaspé.

Subdivisions
There are 7 subdivisions within the RCM:

Cities & Towns (2)
Gaspé
Murdochville

Municipalities (2)
Grande-Vallée
Petite-Vallée

Townships (1)
Cloridorme

Unorganized Territory (2)
Collines-du-Basque
Rivière-Saint-Jean

Demographics

Population

Language

Transportation

Access Routes

Highways and numbered routes that run through the municipality, including external routes that start or finish at the county border:

Autoroutes
None

Principal Highways

Secondary Highways
None

External Routes
None

See also
 List of regional county municipalities and equivalent territories in Quebec

References

Regional county municipalities in Gaspésie–Îles-de-la-Madeleine
Census divisions of Quebec